Obermehnen is a village in the German state of North Rhine-Westphalia in the county of Minden-Lübbecke. The village belongs administratively to the town of Lübbecke.
Obermehnen has 1,360 inhabitants and an area of 9.6 km². At around 137 people per km² Obermehnen has the lowest density of all of Lübbeck's districts, not least because 4.3 km², i.e. 45%, of the parish area consists of uninhabited hill forest on the Wiehen Hills.  Obermehnen is thus the most wooded part of the borough of Lübbecke.

Personalities 
 Eberhard Werner, artist (landscape painter) lived and died in Obermehnen near Lübbecke

References

External links 
Website of the town of Lübbecke

Lübbecke
Wiehen Hills